Mammad Hasan agha Sarijali Javanshir was a military leader and major-general of the Russian army, son and heir of Ibrahimkhalil khan of Karabakh, father of major-general, public figure and poet Jafargulu agha Javanshir also ancestor of famous Azerbaijani singer Khan Shushinski. He was born in 1766, Shusha as first son of Ibrahim Khalil Khan and his principal wife Khanum agha (also known as Nana Khanim) from Jabrayilli clan.

Life 
He led a 500 strong cavalry in pursuit of his cousin Muhammad bey (son of Mehrali bey) who seized rulership of Karabakh during chaos ensued Agha Muhammad Khan's death in 1797.

After break-out of Russo-Persian War, his relations soured with his father following Fatali Shah's favorite and his half-brother Abulfat agha Javanshir's arrival from Iran. Since he was born of a "temporary wife" but had a royal favor, Mammad Hasan felt threatened allied with his other 'legitimate' half-brothers Khanlar agha Javanshir and Mehdigulu agha commanded horse cavalry, he battled 5,000 men led by his half-brother Abulfat agha Javanshir in Dizak, in December 1804 and captured 1,000 people. 

He was given rank of major-general in Imperial Russian Army following his father's submit on 8 July 1805. On June 9, 1805, he participated in a battle with the Persian army together with the Russian army, leading a detachment of the horse cavalry of Karabakh. He was also awarded a medal strewn with diamonds and with an engraving "For Loyalty." 

He fell seriously ill in August 1805 and died on November 19, 1805.

Family 
He had at least two wives:

 Khayrunnisa begüm — daughter of Shahverdi Khan of Ganja
Jafargulu agha Javanshir
 Shukur agha (c. 1789 - before 1844) — Landed noble
 Ismail agha (c. 1807 - ?)
 Khanjan agha (c. 1793 - before 1844) — Landed noble
 Mahmud agha (1818-?)
 Aslan agha (1865 - 1944)
 Khan Shushinski (1901-1979) — Khananda
 Allahyar Javanshirov (1907-1972) — Tar player, Musician
 Rukhsara Javanshirova (1909-1974)
 Aghakhan
 Abbasqoli agha (1834-?)
 Gullü begüm
 Shirin begüm
 Kichik begüm
 Tubi begüm
 Mahisharaf khanum — daughter of Jafarqoli Khan Donboli
 Boyuk Khan (c. 1804 - after 1844) — Landed noble

See also 
 Muhammad Gasim agha Javanshir

References

Military personnel from Shusha
Azerbaijani nobility
Imperial Russian Army generals
1766 births
1805 deaths
People of the Russo-Persian Wars